This is a list of French football transfers for the 2022–23 winter transfer window. Only transfers featuring Ligue 1 and Ligue 2 are listed.

Ligue 1

Note: Flags indicate national team as has been defined under FIFA eligibility rules. Players may hold more than one non-FIFA nationality.

Paris Saint-Germain

In:

Out:

Marseille

In:

Out:

Monaco

In:

Out:

Rennes

In:

Out:

Nice

In:

Out:

Strasbourg

In:

Out:

Lens

In:

Out:

Lyon

In:

Out:

Nantes

In:

Out:

Lille

In:

Out:

Brest

In:

Out:

Reims

In:

Out:

Montpellier

In:

Out:

Angers

In:

Out:

Troyes

In:

Out:

Lorient

In:

Out:

Clermont

In:

Out:

Toulouse

In:

Out:

Ajaccio

In:

Out:

Auxerre

In:

Out:

Ligue 2

Note: Flags indicate national team as has been defined under FIFA eligibility rules. Players may hold more than one non-FIFA nationality.

Saint-Étienne

In:

Out:

Metz

In:

Out:

Bordeaux

In:

Out:

Paris FC

In:

Out:

Sochaux

In:

Out:

Guingamp

In:

Out:

Caen

In:

Out:

Le Havre

In:

Out:

Nîmes

In:

Out:

Pau

In:

Out:

Dijon

In:

Out:

Bastia

In:

Out:

Chamois Niortais

In:

Out:

Amiens

In:

Out:

Grenoble

In:

Out:

Valenciennes

In:

Out:

Rodez

In:

Out:

Quevilly-Rouen

In:

Out:

Laval

In:

Out:

Annecy

In:

Out:

See also
 2022–23 Ligue 1
 2022–23 Ligue 2

References

External links
 Official site of the FFF
 Official site of the Ligue 1 & 2

French
Transfers winter
2022-23